Kangerluarsoruseq (old spelling: Kangerdluarssoruseq) is a former settlement in the Sermersooq municipality in southwestern Greenland. The village is situated about 50 km south of  Nuuk. The fishing port was formerly known by the Danish official name, Færingehavn.

History 
Kangerluarsoruseq was founded in 1927 by Faroese fishermen as Føroyingahavnin. Use of the site as a fishing port ended during the 1990s. The village was abandoned in late 2009.

References 

Former populated places in Greenland
Populated places established in 1927
Populated places disestablished in 2009